Janet Olson is American electrical engineer and electronic design automation industry executive, currently VP of research and developments at Cadence Design Systems. Previously, she was Vice President of Engineering at Synopsys.

She received her BS in Electrical Engineering and Computer Engineering at Carnegie Mellon University and MS in Electrical Engineering from Stanford University.

Awards
2017: Marie Pistilli Award
2015: YWCA Tribute to Women Award

References

Year of birth missing (living people)
Living people
American electrical engineers
Electronic design automation people
Carnegie Mellon University alumni
Stanford University alumni
Electronic engineering award winners